"The Tactful Saboteur" is a science fiction novelette by American writer Frank Herbert, which first appeared in Galaxy Science Fiction magazine in October 1964.  It is the second story in Herbert's ConSentiency universe (after “A Matter of Traces”), one of his three elaborate universes or franchises spanning multiple volumes (the others being the Dune universe and the Destination: Void universe developed with co-author Bill Ransom).

The three chapter story "The Tactful Saboteur", written in a brisk, economical style, proved to be one of Herbert's most popular works. It was subsequently republished in The Worlds of Frank Herbert in 1971 and again in Herbert's 1985 short story collection Eye after interest was renewed in the wake of the film adaptation of Herbert's novel Dune.

Plot

The protagonist of "The Tactful Saboteur" is saboteur extraordinary Jorj X. McKie, an employee of the Bureau of Sabotage (or BuSab).  BuSab is a government agency responsible for conducting dirty tricks "in lieu of red tape" to help slow down and regulate the vast galaxy-spanning bureaucracy of the ConSentiency (under BuSab rules the Secretary of the agency retains his position until he himself is sabotaged).  Tasked with finding missing saboteur Napoleon Bildoon, McKie attempts to penetrate the secrets of the Pan-Spechi, a race divided into groups of five "crèche mates", only one of whom possess ego-awareness at a time.  In so doing he runs afoul of the "Tax Watchers" organization, which is adamantly opposed to the existence of BuSab.

Sources

 Herbert, Frank. "A Matter of Traces" (short story) Fantastic Universe, 1958
 Herbert, Frank. "The Tactful Saboteur" (short story) Galaxy Science Fiction, 1964
 Herbert, Frank. Whipping Star (novel) G. P. Putnam's Sons, 1970
 Herbert, Frank. The Dosadi Experiment (novel) G. P. Putnam's Sons, 1977

External links 
 
 "The Tactful Saboteur" at the Internet Archive

Tactful Saboteur, The
Tactful Saboteur, The
ConSentiency universe
Works originally published in Galaxy Science Fiction